St Andrew's Southgate is an Edwardian Church of England church in Chase Side, Southgate, London. It was built in 1903 and consecrated in 1913. It replaced a chapel-of-ease (to the then parish church Christ Church, Southgate) sited in nearby Farm Road since the 1870s, which became known as St Andrew's in the 1890s. St Andrews's gained parish status in 1928.

Incumbents
The reverend William H.I. Simpson (died 1949), first incumbent of St Andrew's, is buried at Southgate Cemetery along with his wife Madeline Simpson and son Kenneth Simpson of the Royal Air Force Volunteer Reserve who died in an accident while on active service during the First World War.

References

External links
 

Southgate
Southgate, London
Diocese of London
Christian organizations established in 1903
20th-century Church of England church buildings
Gothic Revival church buildings in London